Pavarana is a Buddhist holy day celebrated on Aashvin full moon of the  lunar month. It marks the end of the 3 lunar months of Vassa, sometimes called "Buddhist Lent." The day is marked in some Asian countries where Theravada Buddhism is practiced. On this day, each monk (Pali: bhikkhu) must come before the community of monks (Sangha) and atone for an offense he may have committed during the Vassa.

Mahayana Buddhists also observe Vassa, many Son/Thien monks in Korea and Vietnam observe an equivalent retreat of three months of intensive practice in one location.

Origins 

In India, where Buddhism began, there is a three-month-long rainy season.  According to the Vinaya (Mahavagga, Fourth Khandhaka, section I), in the time of the Buddha, once during this rainy season, a group of normally wandering monks sought shelter by co-habitating in a residence.  In order to minimize potential inter-personal strife while co-habitating, the monks agreed to remain silent for the entire three months and agreed upon a non-verbal means for sharing alms.

After this rains retreat, when the Buddha learned of the monks' silence, he described such a measure as "foolish."  Instead, the Buddha instituted the Pavarana Ceremony as a means for dealing with potential conflict and breaches of disciplinary rules (Patimokkha) during the vassa season.  The Buddha said:

'I prescribe, O Bhikkhus, that the Bhikkhus, when they have finished their Vassa residence, hold Pavâranâ with each other in these three ways: by what [offence] has been seen, or by what has been heard, or by what is suspected. Hence it will result that you live in accord with each other, that you atone for the offences (you have committed), and that you keep the rules of discipline before your eyes.

'And you ought, O Bhikkhus, to hold Pavâranâ in this way:

'Let a learned, competent Bhikkhu proclaim the following ñatti [motion] before the Samgha: "Let the Samgha, reverend Sirs, hear me. To-day is the Pavâranâ day. If the Samgha is ready, let the Samgha hold Pavâranâ."

'Then let the senior Bhikkhu adjust his upper robe so as to cover one shoulder, sit down squatting, raise his joined hands, and say: "I pronounce my Pavâranâ, friends, before the Samgha, by what has been seen, or by what has been heard, or by what is suspected; may you speak to me, Sirs, out of compassion towards me; if I see (an offence), I will atone for it. And for the second time, &c. And for the third time I pronounce my Pavâranâ (&c., down to) if I see (an offence), I will atone for it."

'Then let (each) younger Bhikkhu adjust his upper robe . . . . (&c.)'

See also
Asalha Puja
Māgha Pūjā
Visakha Puja
Uposatha
Vassa
Vinaya
Wan Ok Phansa
Thadingyut Festival
Esala Mangallaya
Kandy Esala Perahera
Ubon Ratchathani Candle Festival
List of Buddhist festivals

Notes

Bibliography 

Rhys Davids,T.W. & Hermann Oldenberg (trans.) ([1881]). Vinaya Texts (Part I). Oxford:Clarendon Press.  Available on-line at http://www.sacred-texts.com/bud/sbe13/sbe1313.htm.  The chapter on Pavarana Day, "Fourth Khandhaka (The Parâvanâ Ceremony)," is available at http://www.sacred-texts.com/bud/sbe13/sbe1315.htm.

Buddhist festivals
Festivals in India
Festivals in Bangladesh
Buddhist holidays
October observances
Observances on non-Gregorian calendars